VIEW is a free magazine located in Hamilton, Ontario, Canada. It was first published on January 5, 1995. VIEW  covered news, culture, arts and entertainment. 

1995 establishments in Ontario
Alternative magazines
Mass media in Hamilton, Ontario
Magazines established in 1995
Weekly magazines published in Canada
Magazines published in Ontario
Free magazines
City guides